"Frozen" is a power ballad by Dutch symphonic metal band Within Temptation. The single was released in Europe on 11 June 2007 as the third release from the album The Heart of Everything (2007). The song and the video both deal with the issue of domestic and child abuse. The band donated the income they receive from Sony BMG for the "Frozen" single to the Child Helpline International. In the UK, the song "The Howling" was chosen for the second single, available as a digital download only. The "Frozen" single contains single versions of both these songs.

Background
The song deals with the subject of domestic and child abuse. On their Web site, the band explained they wanted to raise awareness about "a subject that [they] feel is not discussed in public enough." Lead vocalist Sharon den Adel stated during an interview that she got the inspiration for writing the lyrics from her new experience as a mother. The idea of making it a single and a music video came after, as the band found important to deal with a subject as that in a real and honest way. After choosing the song as a single, the band then approached the Child Helpline International as they felt the need to make something extra with the single sales while considering the subject in question.

Music video
The music video's plot supports the claim that the track is about children abuse and domestic violence. 

The video portrays a typical wealthy family from the Victorian era (probably around 1900 according to the fashion). There is a "head of the household" who is on the outside, respected, hardworking, wealthy man, who has a beautiful wife and daughter named Ana. But behind the door of their manor, he becomes an unruly egomaniacal alcoholic. During their dinner, he starts to roast his wife (possibly because their soup and the liquor he drank left an awful taste in his mouth) and then, when his wife got up from her seat, he grabbed her and pulled her to their bedroom, where he cast her onto the floor and belittled her verbally. In one moment, Ana opens the door of the bedroom and peaks in. Her parents notice her, and her father goes to close the door, as Ana runs away. At night, it seemed as if he raped their (probably pre-teen) daughter Ana, until her mother hysterically cries behind the door of Ana's bedroom and begs her to open the door, which was probably locked by the husband/abuser. The mother is now sure of her suspicion (which was implied with the beginning of her memories, where Ana sits on her bed with a doll clutched in her arms and mom looks worried), and because she knows that nobody would believe her. Finally, she is fed up with her husband's antics, and as revenge for what he did to Ana, she decides to kill him with poison slipped into his morning coffee. As a result, the wife is put in jail, leaving the child an orphan. At the beginning and in the final moments of the video, the mother is shown writing a letter to her daughter, where she apologizes and explains to Ana why she did what she did.  

The video, directed by Oliver Sommer, also features the band playing the song.

Track listing

Standard edition
"Frozen" 
"The Howling"

Maxi edition
"Frozen" 
"The Howling" 
"Sounds of Freedom"
"What Have You Done" 
"The Cross" 
"Frozen" 
"The Howling"

Charts

References

External links
Child Helpline International Web site

2007 singles
Within Temptation songs
Songs written by Sharon den Adel
Songs written by Robert Westerholt
Heavy metal ballads
2006 songs
Roadrunner Records singles
Music videos directed by Oliver Sommer
2000s ballads